Ohe or OHE may refer to:

 Ohe (Allna), a river of Hesse, Germany
 Ohe (Sagter Ems), a river of Lower Saxony, Germany
 Osthannoversche Eisenbahnen, a German transportation company
 Mohe Gulian Airport (IATA code OHE), China
 Overhead equipment
 'ohe, a species of bamboo